"Feel It" is a song by DJ Felli Fel released as his third single. The recording features T-Pain, Sean Paul, Flo Rida and Pitbull. The song samples 20 Fingers' 1994 hit song "Lick It". The single was released on February 10, 2009.

A version is also available featuring Nelly.

Charts

References

2009 singles
DJ Felli Fel songs
T-Pain songs
Sean Paul songs
Flo Rida songs
Pitbull (rapper) songs
2009 songs
So So Def Recordings singles
Songs written by Flo Rida
Songs written by Sean Paul
Songs written by T-Pain
Songs written by Pitbull (rapper)